David Clifford Blank (born 19 December 1959) is a former English cricketer.  Blank was a right-handed batsman who bowled right-arm fast-medium.  He was born in Stoke-on-Trent, Staffordshire.

Blank made his debut for Staffordshire in the 1981 Minor Counties Championship against Cheshire.  Blank played Minor counties cricket for Staffordshire from 1981 to 1991, which included 76 Minor Counties Championship matches and 20 MCCA Knockout Trophy matches.  In 1984, he made his List A debut against Gloucestershire in the NatWest Trophy.  He made 6 further appearances in List A cricket, the last coming against Northamptonshire in the 1990 NatWest Trophy.  In his 7 List A matches, he scored 60 runs at an average of 20.00, with a high score of 23*.  With the ball, he took 9 wickets at a bowling average of 38.55, with best figures of 3/75.

References

External links
David Blank at ESPNcricinfo
David Blank at CricketArchive

1959 births
Living people
Cricketers from Stoke-on-Trent
English cricketers
Staffordshire cricketers